Samuel Izacke of Devon was Chamberlain of the City of Exeter and an antiquarian.

He was the son of Richard Izacke (16241698) and his wife Katherine, of Devon. He was a lawyer who served as Chamberlain of the City of Exeter. He was an antiquarian, who produced a second edition of a book by his father, which has been described as "a careless compilation".

References

Date of birth unknown
Place of birth unknown
Date of death unknown
Place of death unknown
Lawyers from Devon
18th-century English writers
18th-century English male writers
English antiquarians